State Highway 97 (SH 97) is a state highway running  from Cotulla to Waelder in the U.S. state of Texas.

History

SH 97 was designated on July 18, 1924, as a route from Pleasanton to Jourdanton. On September 19, 1928, SH 97 extended south to Rio Grande City via Hebbronville and Tilden; this extension was cancelled on June 25, 1929, and SH 97 was instead extended to Fowlerton; On November 30, 1932, a second section of SH 97 was added from Rio Grande City to Hebbronville, with the possibility of these sections being connected in the future. 

On February 12, 1934, the northern section extended along a new route to Floresville. (causing the cancellation of SH 168 south of there). On March 13, 1934, the northern section extended to Stockdale, replacing SH 168. The southern stretch from Hebbronville to Rio Grande City and the section from Pleasanton to Floresville were cancelled on July 15, 1935. The section from Pleasanton to Floresville was restored on September 22, 1936. 

On December 22, 1937, SH 97 was truncated to Jourdanton, and the section south of there became SH 93, but this change was reverted by April 1, 1938. The highway was slowly constructed, initially between Stockdale and Fowlerton by 1939. 

On July 31, 1942, a section of SH 72 between Fowlerton and Cotulla was added. It was extended to its current terminus in Waelder on March 28, 1952, replacing the western portions of SH 200 and SH 3. On April 27, 1995, SH 97 was relocated in Gonzales.

Major junctions

References

097
Transportation in La Salle County, Texas
Transportation in McMullen County, Texas
Transportation in Atascosa County, Texas
Transportation in Wilson County, Texas
Transportation in Gonzales County, Texas